Sandra Wagner-Sachse (born September 9, 1969) is an archer from Germany who competed at the 1996 Summer Olympics and at the 2000 Summer Olympics.  She won a silver medal in the 1996 team event and a bronze medal in the 2000 team event.

References

1969 births
Olympic archers of Germany
Archers at the 1996 Summer Olympics
Archers at the 2000 Summer Olympics
Living people
Olympic silver medalists for Germany
Olympic bronze medalists for Germany
Olympic medalists in archery
German female archers
Medalists at the 2000 Summer Olympics

Medalists at the 1996 Summer Olympics
20th-century German women